Min is the Mandarin pinyin and Wade–Giles romanization of the Chinese surname written  in simplified Chinese and  in traditional Chinese. It is romanized Man in Cantonese. Min is listed 132nd in the Song dynasty classic text Hundred Family Surnames. As of 2008, it is the 193rd most common surname in China, shared by 520,000 people. In 2013 it was the 224 the most common, with around 4.3 million people sharing the name, accounting for 0.032% of the total population, with the province with the most people sharing the name being Hubei.

Notable people
Min Sun (536–487 BC), major disciple of Confucius
Min Gui (閔珪; 1430–1511), Ming dynasty Viceroy of Liangguang and Minister of War
Min Kai (閔楷; 16th century), Ming dynasty Minister of Revenue
Min Hongxue (閔洪學; 16th–17th century), Ming dynasty Minister of Personnel
Min Mengde (闵梦得; 1565–1628), Ming dynasty Minister of War
Min Zhen (1730–?), Qing dynasty painter
Min Yide (闵一得; 1758–1836), Qing dynasty Taoist
Min Erchang (闵尔昌; 1872–1948), poet and historian
Min Ganghou (闵刚侯; 1904–1971), PRC Vice Minister of Justice
Min Zhiting (闵智亭; 1924–2004), chairman of the Chinese Taoist Association
Min Enze (1924–2016), petrochemical engineer, member of the Chinese Academy of Sciences
Min Naida (闵乃大; born 1911-2001), Chinese-German computer scientist
Min Guirong (闵桂荣; born 1933), astrophysicist, member of the Chinese Academy of Sciences
Min Naiben (1935–2018), physicist, member of the Chinese Academy of Sciences, brother of Min Naida
Min Huifen (1945–2014), erhu master
Min Xiao-Fen, Chinese-American pipa player, sister of Min Huifen
Min Weifang (闵维方; born 1950), former vice president of Peking University
Anchee Min or Min Anqi (born 1957), Chinese-American author
Min Lulei (闵鹿蕾; born 1963), basketball player and coach
Min Chunfeng (born 1969), female discus thrower
Min Jin (born 1978), football player
Min Chunxiao (闵春晓; born 1983), actress

References

Chinese-language surnames
Individual Chinese surnames